Leeds United Football Club is a professional football club based in Leeds, West Yorkshire in England. The club competes in the Premier League, the highest level of the English football league system, and plays its home matches at Elland Road.

Leeds United have won the League Championship three times, four Second Division titles, the FA Cup once, the EFL Cup once, the Charity Shield twice and the Inter-Cities Fairs Cup twice. The club had their most successful period under the management of Don Revie in the 1960s and 1970s, when they won the League title twice, the FA Cup once, the League Cup once and the Inter-Cities Fairs Cup twice. The club have also been runners-up five times in the League Championship, three times in the FA Cup, once each in the EFL Cup, the Charity Shield, the Inter-Cities Fairs Cup, the Cup Winners' Cup and the European Cup, and lost the play-off to keep the Inter-City Fairs Cup trophy.

The club has rivalries with Manchester United and Chelsea. The team's traditional kit colours are white shirts, white shorts and white socks. Their badge features the White Rose of York, which is a symbol of Yorkshire.

History

Pre-Leeds United

Leeds United's predecessor, Leeds City, was formed in 1904 and elected to League membership in 1905. They drew bigger crowds to Elland Road following Herbert Chapman's arrival. In 1914 Chapman declared; "This city is built to support top-flight football", but Leeds City were forcibly disbanded and forced to sell off all their players by The Football League in 1919 in response to allegations of illegal payments to players during the First World War. At Salem Chapel in 1919, Leeds United was formed, and they received an invitation to enter the Midland League, being voted into it on 31 October, taking the place vacated by Leeds City Reserves. Following Leeds City's disbanding, Yorkshire Amateurs bought their stadium Elland Road. Yorkshire Amateurs offered to make way for the new team under the management of former player Dick Ray.

The chairman of Huddersfield Town, Hilton Crowther loaned Leeds United £, to be repaid when Leeds United won promotion to the First Division. He brought in Barnsley's manager Arthur Fairclough and on 26 February 1920, Dick Ray stepped down to become Fairclough's assistant.

1920–1960

On 31 May 1920, Leeds United were elected to the Football League. Over the following years, they consolidated their position in the Second Division and in the 1923–24 season won the title and with it promotion to the First Division. They failed to establish themselves and were relegated in 1926–27. After their relegation, Fairclough resigned, which paved the way for Ray to return as manager. In the years up until the start of World War II Leeds were twice relegated; on both occasions they were re-promoted the following season.

On 5 March 1935, Ray resigned and was replaced by Billy Hampson, who remained in charge for 12 years. In the 1946–47 season after the war, Leeds were relegated again, with the worst league record in their history. After this season, Hampson resigned (he stayed with Leeds as their chief scout for eight months) and was replaced in April 1947 by Willis Edwards. In 1948, Sam Bolton replaced Ernest Pullan as the chairman of Leeds United. Edwards was moved to assistant manager in April 1948 after just one year as manager. He was replaced by Frank Buckley.

Leeds remained in the Second Division until 1955–56, when they once again won promotion to the First Division, inspired by John Charles. Charles was hungry for success at the highest level, and manager Raich Carter was unable to convince him that Leeds could satisfy his ambitions. Charles was sold to Juventus for a then world record of £65,000. The loss of Charles resulted in Leeds being relegated to the Second Division in the 1959–60 season.

1961–1974: Don Revie era

In March 1961, the club appointed former player Don Revie as manager, following the resignation of Jack Taylor. His stewardship began in adverse circumstances; the club was "in financial difficulty" and in 1961–62 only a win in the final game of the season saved the club from relegation to the Third Division. Revie implemented a youth policy and a change of kit colour to an all-white strip in the style of Real Madrid, and Leeds won promotion to the First Division in 1963–64.

In the 1964–65 season, Leeds finished second to rivals Manchester United on goal average. They also reached the final of the FA Cup, losing 2–1 to Liverpool at Wembley after extra-time. In the 1965–66 season, Leeds again finished second in the league, whilst also reaching the semi-finals of the Inter-Cities Fairs Cup, losing on aggregate to Spanish side Real Zaragoza despite manager Revie ordering the fire brigade to flood the pitch before the replay at Elland Road.

The 1966–67 season saw Leeds finish 4th in the league, as well as reaching the semi-finals of the FA Cup, losing 1–0 to Chelsea and the final of the Inter-Cities Fairs Cup, losing 2–0 to GNK Dinamo Zagreb.

With Leeds failing to land a trophy, they nearly doubled their record transfer in 1967–68, buying Sheffield United centre-forward Mick Jones for £100,000. The season saw Leeds win their first major trophy, the League Cup, with Terry Cooper scoring the only goal of a 1–0 victory against Arsenal in the final. Leeds finished fourth in the First Division and were beaten in the FA Cup semi-finals by Everton. They also reached a second successive Inter-Cities Fairs Cup final and this time won the trophy, beating Hungarian club Ferencváros over two legs; Leeds won the first leg 1–0, and a month later defended their lead with a 0–0 draw in Budapest.

Having found success in both domestic and European cup competitions, manager Revie chose to focus on the league for the 1968–69 season. Leeds secured the title in April 1969 with a 0–0 draw with challengers Liverpool at Anfield, whose supporters congratulated Leeds. Leeds set a number of records including most points (67), most wins (27), fewest defeats (2), and most home points (39); a still-unbroken club record is their 34 match unbeaten run that extended into the following season. Leeds reinforced their front line breaking the British transfer record by signing Allan Clarke from Leicester City for £165,000. They targeted the treble in 1969–70 and came close to achieving this, only to fail on all three fronts in a congested close season, finishing second in the league to Everton, losing the 1970 FA Cup Final to Chelsea (after a replay), and exiting the European Cup with a semi-final defeat to Celtic.

Having rejected an offer to manage Birmingham City, Revie chose to remain at Leeds for the 1970–71 season. Leeds and Arsenal both challenged for the title that season, though it would be the Gunners who would claim the league title, finishing one point ahead of Leeds after the latter lost to West Bromwich Albion following a controversial "offside" goal. United were also knocked out of the FA Cup by Fourth Division side Colchester United. Leeds again found success in the Inter-Cities Fairs Cup though, beating Juventus in the final on away goals. Leeds again finished as runners-up in the 1971–72 season, but United did reach the 1972 FA Cup Final, lifting the trophy after a 1–0 victory over Arsenal in the final.

In the 1972–73 season, the Whites again came close to a Treble, but they finished third in the league, losing the 1973 FA Cup Final to Second Division Sunderland 1–0 against all expectations, and reached the final of the European Cup Winners' Cup against Italian club AC Milan at the Kaftanzoglio Stadium, where they were beaten 1–0 following some controversial refereeing by Christos Michas who was later banned by UEFA for 'fixing' other matches. Revie was offered the managers role at Everton in the summer, but chose to remain at Leeds. The following season, they won the 1973–74 First Division with a five-point lead over second-placed Liverpool. Revie chose to take the job of England national team manager at the end of the 1973–74 season.

In his 13 years in charge, Revie guided Leeds to two Football League First Division titles, one FA Cup, one League Cup, two Inter-Cities Fairs Cups, one Football League Second Division title and one Charity Shield. He also guided them to three more FA Cup Finals, two more FA Cup Semi-finals, one more Inter-Cities Fairs Cup Final and one Inter-Cities Fairs Cup Semi-final, one European Cup Winners' Cup Final and one European Cup Semi-final. The team also finished second in the Football League First Division five times, third once and fourth twice. In a survey of leading football writers, historians and academics by Total Sport magazine, Revie's Leeds United were voted as one of the 50 greatest football teams of all time.

1974–1988: Post-Revie and relegation
Following the 1973–74 season, Revie left Leeds and Elland Road to manage the England national team. Brian Clough was appointed as Revie's successor. This was a surprise appointment, as Clough had been an outspoken critic of Revie and the team's tactics. Clough's tenure as manager started badly, with defeat in the Charity Shield against Liverpool in which Billy Bremner and Kevin Keegan were sent off for fighting. Under Clough, the team performed poorly, and after only 44 days he was dismissed.

Clough was replaced by former England captain Jimmy Armfield. Armfield took Revie's ageing team to the final of the 1974–75 European Cup, in which they were defeated by Bayern Munich under controversial circumstances. Assisted by coach Don Howe, Armfield rebuilt Revie's team, and though it no longer dominated English football, it remained in the top ten for subsequent seasons. However, the board became impatient for success and dismissed Armfield in 1978, replacing him with Jock Stein, who also lasted just 44 days before leaving to manage Scotland. The board appointed Jimmy Adamson, but he was unable to stop the decline, and in 1980 Adamson resigned and was replaced by former player Allan Clarke. Despite spending freely on players, he was unable to stem the tide, and the club was relegated at the end of 1981–82. Clarke was replaced by former teammate Eddie Gray.

With no money to spend on team building, Gray concentrated on youth development, but was unable to guide them to promotion from the Second Division. The board again became impatient and dismissed Gray in 1985, replacing him with another Revie teammate, Billy Bremner. Bremner found it just as difficult to achieve promotion, although Leeds reached the 1987 play-off final, but were defeated by Charlton Athletic. Leeds also endured a near miss in the FA Cup, losing out to Coventry City in the semi-finals.

1988–1996: Howard Wilkinson era
In October 1988, with the team 21st in the Second Division, Bremner was fired to make way for Howard Wilkinson. Leeds avoided relegation that season, and in March 1989 signed Gordon Strachan from Manchester United for £300,000. The Scottish midfielder was named captain, and helped Leeds win the Second Division in 1989–90 and gain promotion back to the First Division. Leeds finished fourth in 1990–91, and in the 1991–92 season they became champions of England for the third time. During the close season Leeds were founder members of the new Premier League, which became the top division of English football. However, the 1992–93 season saw Leeds exiting the Champions League in the early stages, and eventually finishing 17th in the league (having won no away matches in the league), narrowly avoiding relegation. Wilkinson's Leeds were unable to provide any consistent challenge for honours, and his position was not helped by a poor display in the 1996 League Cup final which Leeds lost to Aston Villa. Leeds could only finish 13th in 1995–96, and after a 4–0 home defeat by Manchester United early in 1996–97, Wilkinson had his contract terminated. One of the legacies of Wilkinson and youth coach Paul Hart was the development of Leeds United's youth academy, which has produced numerous talented footballers over the years.

1997–2001: Graham and O'Leary

Leeds appointed George Graham as Wilkinson's successor. This appointment was controversial as Graham had previously received a one-year ban from The Football Association for receiving illegal payments from a football agent. Graham made some astute purchases and also helped blood youngsters from Leeds' youth cup winning side. By the end of the 1997–98 season, Leeds had qualified for the following season's UEFA Cup. In October 1998, Graham left to become manager of Tottenham Hotspur, and Leeds opted to replace him with assistant manager David O'Leary.

Under O'Leary and assistant Eddie Gray, Leeds never finished outside the top five in the Premier League, and secured qualification for both the UEFA Cup and the UEFA Champions League, enjoying cup runs to the semi-finals of both competitions. However, during the same period, the team's image was tarnished when players Jonathan Woodgate and Lee Bowyer were involved in an incident that left an Asian student in hospital with severe injuries. The resulting court case took nearly two years to resolve; Bowyer was cleared, but Woodgate convicted of affray and sentenced to community service. Additionally, in the UEFA Cup semi-final against Galatasaray in Istanbul, two Leeds fans were stabbed to death before the game.

2001–2007: Financial crisis and fall to League One
Under chairman Peter Ridsdale, Leeds had taken out large loans against the prospect of the share of the TV rights and sponsorship revenues from Champions League qualification and subsequent progress in the competition. However, Leeds narrowly failed to qualify for the Champions League in two successive seasons, and as a consequence did not receive enough income to repay the loans. The first indication that the club was in financial trouble was the sale of Rio Ferdinand to Manchester United for approximately £30 million. Ridsdale and O'Leary publicly fell out over the sale, and O'Leary was dismissed and replaced by former England manager Terry Venables. Leeds performed woefully under Venables, and other players were sold to repay the loans, including Jonathan Woodgate, whom Ridsdale had promised Venables would not be sold. Tensions mounted between Ridsdale and Venables and, with the team underachieving, Venables was dismissed and replaced by Peter Reid. Ridsdale resigned from the Leeds board and was replaced by existing non-executive director Professor John McKenzie. At this time Leeds were in danger of relegation, but managed to avoid the drop in the penultimate game of the season, beating Arsenal 3–2 away with a late strike by Mark Viduka.

Reid was given a permanent contract at Leeds the following summer and brought in several players on loan. An unsuccessful start to the 2003–04 season saw Reid dismissed, and Eddie Gray take over as caretaker manager until the end of the season. An insolvency specialist, Gerald Krasner, led a consortium of local businessmen which took over Leeds and oversaw the sale of the club's assets, including senior and emerging youth players of any value. Leeds were relegated during the 2003–04 season.

Following relegation to the Championship, assistant manager Kevin Blackwell was appointed manager. Most of the remaining players were sold or released on free transfers to further reduce the high wage bill; Blackwell was forced to rebuild almost the entire squad through free transfers, and Leeds were forced to sell both their training ground and stadium in the autumn of 2004.

In 2005, the club was bought by Ken Bates, who paid £10 million for a 50% stake. Under Blackwell, Leeds reached the Championship play-off final, which they lost to Watford. With the team performing poorly, Blackwell's contract was terminated, and Leeds hired John Carver as caretaker manager, but his spell was not a success and he was relieved of his duties, with Dennis Wise eventually installed as his replacement. Wise was unable to lift the team out of the relegation zone for much of the season, despite bringing in a number of experienced loan players and free transfers on short-term deals. With relegation virtually assured, Leeds entered administration on 4 May 2007, thus incurring a league-imposed 10-point deduction that officially relegated the club to the third tier of English football; the club had previously never played any lower than the second tier. The players whom Wise had brought in were released; he was forced to build a squad almost from scratch, and because of administration Leeds were unable to sign any players until a few days before the opening game of the season.

2007–2010: League One
On 3 July 2007, HM Revenue and Customs (HMRC) lodged a legal challenge to Leeds' Creditors' Voluntary Agreement (CVA). Under league rules, if the club were still in administration at the start of the following season, Leeds would have been prevented from starting their season by the Football League. Following the challenge by HMRC, the club was put up for sale by KPMG, and again Ken Bates' bid was accepted. The League eventually sanctioned this under the "exceptional circumstances rule" but imposed a 15-point deduction due to the club failing to exit administration with a CVA, as the Football League rules required. On 31 August 2007, HMRC decided not to pursue its legal challenge any further.

Despite the 15-point deduction, Wise and his assistant Gus Poyet guided Leeds to a play-off position, only for Poyet to leave for Tottenham, and Wise quitting to take up a position at Newcastle United. Wise was replaced by former club captain Gary McAllister. Leeds went on to secure a place in the play-off final, but were beaten by Doncaster Rovers. The following season saw a poor run of results, and McAllister was dismissed after a run of five defeats in a row. He was replaced by Simon Grayson, who resigned from his post as manager of Blackpool to take the position. Under Grayson, Leeds made the play-offs once again, but were beaten over the two legs of the semi-finals by Millwall.

In the 2009–10 season, the team secured the best start ever to a season by a Leeds side, and caused a major upset in the third round of the FA Cup by beating Manchester United at Old Trafford. After the impressive run in the FA Cup, Leeds' league form suffered, with the team taking just seven points from a possible 24. However, the team rallied and Leeds won their final game of the season to confirm promotion to the Championship as runners-up to Norwich City.

2010–2014: Return to the Championship
Leeds spent much of the 2010–11 season in the play-off places, but eventually finished in seventh place, just missing out on the play-offs.

In May 2011, it was announced that Leeds chairman Ken Bates had bought the club and become the owner of Leeds. Before the match against Middlesbrough, about 300 Leeds fans protested about what they saw as a lack of investment in the playing side, to which Bates responded by calling the protesters "morons".

Despite securing promotion to the Championship, Grayson was dismissed after failing to mount a consistent challenge for promotion to the Premier League. Neil Warnock was appointed as the club's new manager on 18 February, with his initial contract lasting until the end of the 2012–13 season.

On 21 November 2012, Middle East-based private equity group GFH Capital finalised a deal for a protracted takeover of Leeds, gaining a 100% shareholding in the club. It was also announced Ken Bates would remain as chairman until the end of the 2012–13 season and then become club president. The takeover was officially completed on 21 December 2012.

Despite runs to the quarter-finals of the League Cup and the fifth round of the FA Cup (albeit with both runs ending in five-goal thrashings, by Chelsea and Manchester City respectively), Leeds' league form in the 2012–13 season was generally mediocre, with the club never making any real challenge for the play-off places. Warnock resigned with six games remaining, and Leeds just five points above the relegation zone. Brian McDermott replaced Warnock, and the club won three of their final five games of the season, enough to avoid relegation. That summer, Bates stepped down as chairman, and ultimately left the club altogether a few weeks later following a dispute over expenses.

On 7 January 2014, Leeds United's managing director David Haigh was involved in Sport Capital, a consortium involving the managing director of Leeds United's main sponsors, Enterprise Insurance, Andrew Flowers. Sports Capital came close to completing a transaction with GFH Capital that would have given them a 75% stake in the business.

On 30 January, Sport Capital's takeover collapsed due to a lack of "financial backing". Haigh released a statement conceding that it was unable to complete a deal despite two months ago agreeing to purchase a 75% stake in the club from the owners Gulf Finance House. Haigh said he and Sport Capital had "injected substantial sums into the club to ensure its viability" but earlier in the week fellow consortium member Andrew Flowers, the managing director of Leeds' shirt sponsor Enterprise Insurance, stated that GFH had "breached their covenant with us" after inviting a rival bid from Massimo Cellino, the president of the Serie A club Cagliari Calcio. Haigh's statement read:

On 31 January 2014, under controversial circumstances, it was reported that manager Brian McDermott had been removed from his position as the club's manager following a string of poor results, while the controversy surrounding the club was resolved. New club captain Ross McCormack expressed his support for the former manager. By 3 February the BBC was reporting that McDermott had been called by a lawyer representing Massimo Cellino "and told he had been relieved of his duties". However, Cellino still did not own the club, as the Football League had not yet approved his purchase, so neither he nor his lawyer could dismiss the manager. McDermott, therefore, remained in his post.

After weeks of speculation regarding the purchase of Leeds United, on 7 February 2014, Leeds United had announced that they had exchanged contracts for the sale of Leeds to Cellino's family consortium Eleonora Sport Ltd. The deal saw the Cellino family acquire a 75% ownership of the club, subject to Football League Approval.

At its meeting on 23 March 2014, the board of the Football League decided unanimously that Cellino's conviction by an Italian court meant that he did not meet its owners and directors test, so could not take over Leeds United.

In the backdrop of Cellino's takeover, Leeds suffered an appalling second half of the season, dropping from the play-off places to the fringes of the relegation battle. In the end, the weak performances of the teams below Leeds meant that they were never in any real danger of going down, and a late run of wins put survival beyond doubt well before the end of the season. However, McDermott still resigned his position a few weeks after the season ended.

2014–2017: Cellino era
On 5 April, Cellino was successful in his appeal with independent QC Tim Kerr to take over the club. The takeover was completed on 10 April, with Cellino's company, Eleonora Sport Limited, buying 75% of the club's shares. Two months later, the inexperienced Dave Hockaday was surprisingly appointed head coach, with Junior Lewis hired as his assistant. After only 70 days, the pair were fired by Cellino. Darko Milanič was given the head coach position in September 2014 becoming the club's first manager from outside the British isles and the first Slovene manager in English football, but left the club the following month. On 1 November 2014, Neil Redfearn was confirmed as the new head coach.

On 1 December 2014, Cellino was disqualified by the Football League after it obtained documents from an Italian court, where he was found guilty of tax evasion. He was disqualified from running the club until 10 April 2015, and on 24 February 2015, Cellino announced he would not be returning to the club after his ban ended. Redfearn was replaced by former Man City Player Uwe Rösler as head coach in the summer of 2015, but Rosler was himself replaced by Steve Evans after only a few months in the role.

On 30 October 2015, Cellino agreed a deal in principle with Leeds Fans Utd to sell a majority stake in the club. When asked to legally commit to an exclusivity period to allow due diligence to commence, he reneged.

On 2 June 2016, Garry Monk was appointed as the new head coach, replacing Steve Evans. On 4 January 2017, Italian businessman Andrea Radrizzani purchased a 50% stake in the club from Massimo Cellino. At the close of the 2016/17 season, Leeds narrowly missed out on the play-offs. Leeds had been in the play-off positions for the majority of the season before a poor run of form in the final games saw them drop into seventh place. This was compounded by being knocked out in the fourth round of the FA Cup by non-league side Sutton United 1–0, who, at the time, were 84 places and three divisions below Leeds.

2017–present: Radrizzani takeover and Premier League return
On 23 May 2017, Radrizzani announced a 100% buyout of Leeds United, buying the remaining 50% shares from previous co-owner Massimo Cellino, with Radrizzani taking full ownership of the club. Garry Monk resigned as head coach two days after the takeover, after one season at the club in which he guided them to seventh place. In June 2017, former Spain international Thomas Christiansen was announced as the new head coach of Leeds, joining from APOEL. This was followed by Radrizzani introducing Leeds United Ladies back to Leeds United ownership. Also in June, Radrizzani completed the purchase of Elland Road from Jacob Adler's company, Teak Commercial Limited for £20 million, using his own company Greenfield Investment Pte Ltd.

On 4 February 2018, Christiansen was dismissed after a bad run of games, leaving the team 10th in the Championship table. On 6 February, Paul Heckingbottom was confirmed as Christiansen's replacement. On 24 May 2018, Leeds announced that 49ers Enterprises had bought shares in the club to become a minority investor. The 49ers Enterprises is the business arm of the NFL side San Francisco 49ers, owned by Denise DeBartolo York, Jed York and John York.

Heckingbottom was dismissed by Leeds on 1 June 2018 after being at the club for just four months. Argentine manager Marcelo Bielsa was named the club's new manager on 15 June, signing a two-year contract with an option of a third year. In doing so he became the highest-paid manager in Leeds United's history.

Bielsa's first season in charge saw Leeds make an impressive start and Leeds remained in the top 2 with Norwich City for the majority of the season, on course for automatic promotion to the Premier League. However, a poor end to the season saw the team lose out on automatic promotion to Sheffield United. They entered the play-offs against Derby County; despite winning the first leg 1–0, they ultimately lost 4–3 on aggregate which consigned them to another season in the championship.

On 17 July 2020, after 16 years out of the Premier League, Leeds were promoted back to the top flight following West Bromwich Albion's loss to Huddersfield Town. Stoke City's defeat of Brentford the following day confirmed they would go up as winners of the Championship. Leeds had been in the top 2 for most of the season and had never dropped lower than 5th in the table, eventually going on to finish 10 points clear of West Brom in 2nd.

Leeds' first season back in the Premier League produced a top half finish, their points tally was the most by a newly promoted side since Ipswich Town in the 2000–01 season. However, the following season was not as successful and following a series of poor results, Bielsa was dismissed by the club in February 2022. Jesse Marsch was appointed as Bielsa's replacement, and he successfully led the club to avoid relegation on the final day of the season, following a 2–1 win over Brentford at the Brentford Community Stadium. Marsch was dismissed by the club in February 2023, and was replaced by Javi Gracia.

Colours
In Leeds' first 15 years, the club kit was modelled on Huddersfield Town's blue and white striped shirts, white shorts and dark blue socks with blue and white rings on the turnovers, because Huddersfield's chairman Hilton Crowther was attempting to merge the two clubs. He eventually left Huddersfield to take over at Leeds.

In 1934, Leeds switched to blue and yellow halved shirts incorporating the city crest, white shorts and blue socks with yellow tops. The kit was worn for the first time on 22 September 1934. In 1950, Leeds switched to yellow shirts with blue sleeves and collars, white shorts and black, blue and gold hooped socks. In 1955, Leeds changed again to royal blue shirts with gold collars, white shorts, and blue and yellow hooped socks, thus echoing the original Leeds City strip. In 1961, Don Revie introduced a plain white strip throughout.

Badge
Leeds United's first badge appeared in 1934. Like Leeds City before them, the club adopted the coat of arms of Leeds, which remained on the kit in various guises until 1961. For a number of seasons after 1961–62, when the all-white strip replaced the blue and gold, the shirts sported no badge at all.

A perching owl badge was added to the strip in 1964. The design was a surprise given Revie's superstition about the symbolism of birds. The owl derived from the three owls that feature on the city's coat of arms, which in turn were taken from the coat of arms of Sir John Savile, the first alderman of Leeds. The owl was usually navy blue, but was coloured gold for the 1968 Football League Cup Final.

Between 1971 and 1973, Leeds used the "LUFC" script that runs down the centre of the current badge, albeit in a diagonal fashion rather than the present vertical. The script made a reappearance on the 'retro-look' Asics kit used during the 1995–96 season. In 1973 came the embodiment of 1970s imagery with the iconic "smiley" badge, made up of the letters L and U in bubble writing. Revie's predilection for gimmicks was years ahead of its time, and done with the explicit intention of gaining acceptance from a public outside West Yorkshire. In 1977, the smiley badge was rotated through 45° and the yellow and blue colours were reversed. The yellow smiley returned the following year, but was now enclosed in a circle surrounded by the words "LEEDS UNITED AFC".

In the 1978–79 season, a new badge appeared that was similar to that of the previous season, except now the words "LEEDS UNITED AFC" enclosed a stylised peacock (a reference to the club's nickname, "The Peacocks") rather than the yellow smiley.

In 1984, another badge was introduced which lasted until 1998. The distinctive rose and ball badge used the traditional blue, gold and white colours, and incorporated the White Rose of York, the club's name, and a football (a truncated icosahedron similar to the Adidas Telstar, but in Leeds colours) in the core section.

In the 1998–99 season, the club logo was replaced with a more "European" shield design. The shield retained the white rose, as well as the blue, gold and white colours, with "LUFC" reading vertically down the centre. In 1999, the badge was slightly amended in that the football from the 1984 badge was added to the centre of the white rose.

On 20 February 2019, Leeds United revealed a predominantly gold coloured badge that would be worn on the players' kit during the club's centenary season. The badge retained the existing shield design, but replaced the "LUFC" script with the words "LEEDS UNITED" above and "100 YEARS" below the shield. The crest also carried the date "1919", the year that the club was founded, as well as the centenary year "2019".

Stadium

Leeds United have only ever used one stadium as their home ground, Elland Road, where they have played at since their foundation in 1919. An all-seater stadium situated in Beeston, Leeds, West Yorkshire, England, it is the 14th largest football stadium in England. Elland Road was previously occupied by their predecessors, Leeds City before their disbanding. After their formation, the council allowed them to rent the stadium until they could afford to buy it. With the exception of periods from the 1960s until 1983, and from 1997 to 2004, the local council owned the stadium. However, it was sold by the club in October 2004, with a 25-year sale-leaseback deal being agreed, and a commercial buy-back clause also included for when the club's finances improve sufficiently.

Initially, the ground was the home of the Holbeck Rugby Club, which played in the Northern Rugby Union, the forerunner of the Rugby Football League. One of Leeds' first nicknames, 'The Peacocks''', comes from the original name of Elland Road – 'The Old Peacock ground'. It was named by the original owners of the ground, Bentley's Brewery, after its pub The Old Peacock, which still faces the site. The newly formed Leeds City agreed to rent and later own Elland Road. After their disbandment, it was sold to Leeds United. The most recent stand at Elland Road is the East, or Family, Stand, a cantilever structure completed during the 1992–93 season that can hold 17,000 seated spectators. It is a two-tiered stand that continues around the corners and is the largest part of the stadium. The Don Revie Stand was opened at the start of the 1994–95 season, and can hold just under 7,000 seated spectators. The roof of the West Stand holds a television commentary gantry and walkway for TV personnel. Elland Road was named in December 2009 as one of the contenders for the England 2018 World Cup bid. As a result of the bid, Leeds drew up plans to redevelop parts of Elland Road and increase the stadium's capacity. Ken Bates also revealed plans to take out the executive boxes out of the South Stand to increase the starting capacity by a further 2,000–3,000. More executive boxes would be built in the east stand.

Alex Ferguson has said that Elland Road has one of the most intimidating atmospheres in European football.

A statue of legendary captain Billy Bremner was unveiled outside the stadium in 1999 in the area known as 'Bremner Square'. Then a bronze statue for Leeds' most successful manager Don Revie was also unveiled in 2012, celebrating the 40th anniversary of the club winning the FA Cup. As part of the renovation of the Bremner statue in summer 2018, a 'Bremner Square XI' was announced. The XI featured ten further 'legendary Leeds players' who have engraved stones featuring their key stats and achievements during their careers with Leeds United.

On 28 June 2017, new Leeds owner Andrea Radrizzani completed the re-purchase of Elland Road, via his investment company, Greenfield Investment Pte Ltd, the company used to buy Leeds. Leeds will have a period of paying no rent and be able to invest in other areas of the club. In July 2018, Elland Road was voted 'Best Ground in the Championship' by football supporters.

Supporters
In 2003, Peter Reid commented on the support at Elland Road after being relieved of his managerial duties, saying that "In 30 years I've never seen support like I did at the Leeds/Arsenal game a couple of weeks ago. The fans at Leeds are fantastic." Two other former Leeds managers have also spoken highly of the club's supporters; Kevin Blackwell said "fans will follow them everywhere" and David O'Leary commented "There is an immense fan base and they are still with the club".

Leeds supporters are renowned for singing the signature song "Marching on Together" before and during matches. Other notable songs Leeds fans sing during games include "We Are The Champions, Champions of Europe" (more commonly known as WACCOE) in reference to the 1975 European Cup Final which Leeds lost due to dubious refereeing decisions. Riots by the Leeds fans during the match led to UEFA banning the club from European competition for four years, although this was reduced to two years on appeal.

Famous Leeds supporters include: actors Ralph Ineson, Russell Crowe, Matthew Lewis, Nikolaj Coster-Waldau; comedian Jon Richardson and boxer Josh Warrington.

Leeds United supporters also have their own salute. Leeds are 10th in the all-time average attendance figures for the Football League and Premier League. They have the third most rivalries in the English League. Alex Ferguson once said that Elland Road has one of the most intimidating atmospheres in European football.

An LGBT fans' group, Marching Out Together, was formed in 2017 and sits on the club's Supporters' Advisory Group. There is also a group for Sikh supporters, called Punjabi Whites. The Leeds United Disabled Organisation (LUDO) was founded in 1992. There is a well-known hooligan firm amongst the fans known as the Leeds United Service Crew.

Rivalries

Leeds' main rivals are widely considered to be Manchester United. As the largest cities within the historic counties of Yorkshire and Lancashire, animosity between the regions date back to the Wars of the Roses, although more recent tensions between the football clubs date back to the 1960s and the iconic managers of Don Revie and Matt Busby.
The rivalry has been described as one of the fiercest in world football, and the most intense and inexplicable in England. Alex Ferguson described Elland Road as ‘hostile’ and ‘frightening’, and stated that the ferocity of games between the two surpassed the ones with Liverpool.

On the pitch, the clubs have competed for league titles and cups in the 1960s, 1970s, 1990s and early 2000s; while players such as Johnny Giles, Gordon Strachan and Eric Cantona have been highly successful after moving between the clubs. Leeds’ relegation to the Football League in 2004 caused a long interval in games between the two, although promotion in 2020 restored their top flight status.

Leeds' secondary rivals are generally regarded to be Chelsea, which largely stems from the 1970 FA Cup Final. The clubs competed at the top end of the Premier League in the late 1990s and early 2000s and games were often bad-tempered. While the rivalry has subsided with Leeds' relegation 2004, controversial figures such as Ken Bates and Dennis Wise – both of whom had long associations with Chelsea – presided over the club's relegation to the third division in 2007 and subsequent administration, prolonging the enmity.

Leeds also hold extreme bitterness towards the Turkish club Galatasaray following the deaths of the two supporters the night before a UEFA Cup semi-final in Istanbul in April 2000. During the game, supporters of Galatasaray mocked the deaths, while their team refused to wear black armbands. The then Leeds chairman Peter Ridsdale accused the club of 'lacking common decency’.

During their time outside of the Premier League between 2004 and 2020, Leeds had a number of transitory rivalries with divisional competitors such as Cardiff City, Derby County and Millwall, as well as Yorkshire neighbours Sheffield Wednesday and Huddersfield Town.

Music

The single 'Leeds United' was released in April 1972 to coincide with the team reaching the 1972 FA Cup Final, composed by Les Reed and Barry Mason with the team providing the vocals. The record stayed in the UK Singles Chart for almost three months, peaking at number 10. The B-side 'Leeds! Leeds! Leeds!' (commonly known as Marching on Together'') has since become the club's anthem and is regularly sung by supporters.

Records and statistics

Striker Peter Lorimer is currently the club's all-time record goal scorer, scoring 238 in his 19 years at the club across two spells; he is also the youngest player to ever play for the club. The most goals managed in a single season for the club is 43 by John Charles, in the 1953–54 season. The fastest goal in the club's history was scored by Jermaine Wright, when he scored after just ten seconds against Burnley in November 2004.

The record transfer fee paid by Leeds for a player was around £30 million for Hoffenheim forward Georginio Rutter. The highest transfer fee received for a Leeds player was approximately £60 million from Barcelona for Raphinha; it surpassed their previous highest transfer fee received, when they sold Rio Ferdinand to Manchester United for a then transfer record for a defender twenty years earlier.

The club's record attendance is 57,892 against Sunderland at Elland Road, in a fifth round FA Cup replay in 1967. The highest league record at Elland Road was 52,368 for a competitive match against Manchester United on 17 April 1965.

Leeds' highest ever league finish is first in the First Division in the 1968–69, 1973–74 and 1991–92 seasons. Their lowest ever league finish was fifth in League One in 2007–08, finishing the season by losing to Doncaster Rovers in the play-off final. This was their first ever season in the third tier of English football.

Leeds' longest ever unbeaten run in the league was between 19 October 1968 and 30 August 1969, to which they remained unbeaten for thirty-four games on their way to the First Division title.  Their longest run of consecutive victories in the league is nine, which they achieved between 26 September 1931 and 21 November 1931 (in the Second Division).

Players

First-team squad

Out on loan

Reserves and Academy

Management

First-team staff
{| class="wikitable"
|-
!Position
!Staff
|-
|Head coach||Javi Gracia
|-
|Assistant coach||Zigor Aranalde
|-
|Assistant coach||Michael Skubala
|-
|Assistant coach||Mikel Antía
|-
|Fitness coach||Juan José Solla
|-
|Goalkeeper coach||Marcos Abad
|-
|Loans manager||Andrew Taylor
|-

Medical, performance and analysis team
{| class="wikitable"
|-
!Position
!Staff
|-
|Head of medicine and performance||Rob Price
|-
|Head physio||Henry McStay
|-
|Head of analysis||Guillermo Alonso
|-
|Performance analyst||Jordan Davison
|-
|Rehab & fitness conditioning coach||Rubén Crespo
|-
|Sports scientist||Tom Robinson
|-
|Assistant physio||Daryl Carter
|-
|Assistant physio||Bill Atton
|-
|Assistant physio||William Franklin
|-
|Club doctor||Rishi Dhand
|-
|Performance nutritionist||Andy Jenkinson
|-

Scouting team
{| class="wikitable"
|-
!Position
!Staff
|-
|Head of european recruitment||Gaby Ruiz
|-
|Head of football development (Asia)||Toshiya Fujita
|-
|Head of emerging talent||Craig Dean
|-
|Scout||Dani Salas
|-
|Scout||Paco Peral
|-
|Recruitment analyst||Alex Davies
|-
|Recruitment analyst||Andrea Iore

Owners and directors

Source:

Managers

The club's current manager Javi Gracia, is the thirty-ninth permanent holder of the position since Leeds were founded in 1919. Leeds have also had ten caretaker managers, three of whom had previously occupied the role on a full-time basis, and one of whom occupied the role three times. The most successful manager of Leeds United is Don Revie, who won two First Division titles, two Inter-Cities Fairs Cups, one Second Division title, one FA Cup, one League Cup and one Charity Shield in his 13-year reign as manager. He is also the club's longest-serving manager, presiding over 740 games from 1961 to 1974.

Honours
Source:

Domestic

League
First Division (level 1)
Winners: 1968–69, 1973–74, 1991–92
Runners-up: 1964–65, 1965–66, 1969–70, 1970–71, 1971–72

Second Division/Championship (level 2)
Winners: 1923–24, 1963–64, 1989–90, 2019–20
Runners-up: 1927–28, 1931–32, 1955–56
Play-off runners-up: 1987, 2006

League One (level 3)
Runners-up: 2009–10
Play-off runners-up: 2008

Cups
FA Cup
Winners: 1971–72
Runners-up: 1964–65, 1969–70, 1972–73

League Cup
Winners: 1967–68
Runners-up: 1995–96

FA Charity Shield
Winners: 1969, 1992
Runners-up: 1974

European

European Cup
Runners-up: 1974–75

European Cup Winners' Cup
Runners-up: 1972–73

Inter-Cities Fairs Cup
Winners: 1967–68, 1970–71
Runners-up: 1966–67

Inter-Cities Fairs Cup Trophy Play-Off
Runners-up: 1971

References

External links

 
Football clubs in England
Premier League clubs
Association football clubs established in 1919
Companies that have entered administration in the United Kingdom
Football clubs in West Yorkshire
FA Cup winners
EFL Cup winners
EFL Championship clubs
1919 establishments in England
Sport in Leeds
Phoenix clubs (association football)
Former English Football League clubs
Inter-Cities Fairs Cup winning clubs